This Is My Song may refer to: 
This Is My Song (Ray Conniff album) (1967)
This Is My Song (Patti Page album) (1957)
This Is My Song (Deniece Williams album) (1998)
"This is my song" (1934 song), a song written by Lloyd Stone to the tune of Jean Sibelius' Finlandia
"This Is My Song" (1951 song), a song written by Dick Charles and popularized in 1953 by Patti Page
"This Is My Song" (1967 song), a song written by Charles Chaplin and popularized in 1967 by Petula Clark
"This Is My Song!", a 2004 song by Carbon Lead from Indian Summer